Lixa is a genus of snout moths. It contains only one species, Lixa productalis, which is found on Borneo and Taiwan.

Adult males are reddish-fawn speckled with black. There is a black line which extends from the tip of the forewing to two-thirds of the length of the interior border of the hindwings.

Subspecies
Lixa productalis productalis (Borneo)
Lixa productalis taiwana Heppner, 2005 (Taiwan)

References

Moths described in 1865
Pyralini